Fuad Rouhani (23 October 1907 – 30 January 2004) was an Iranian administrator and translator. He served as the first Secretary-General of OPEC between 21 January 1961 and 30 April 1964. He is the only Iranian to hold this office from OPEC's establishment to date.

Biography
Fuad Rouhani was born in Tehran on 23 October 1907. Rouhani completed his early education in Tehran, and went to work in the oil industry, then under British control.

Rouhani, educated as a lawyer, was born in Iran and trained in London and Paris. Rouhani worked in a company which discovered first and produced oil  in the country, the Anglo-Iranian Oil Company, which later became British Petroleum. He advised the Iranian government on its nationalization of the company in 1951, and later advised Shah Mohammed Reza Pahlavi on oil matters.

He earned two law degrees from the University of London in 1937. A quarter-century later, in the middle of a career in public service, he entered the University of Paris, receiving a doctorate in law in 1968.

He went on to advise the Shah from 1965 to 1968, he was secretary general of the Regional Cooperation for Development organization, which worked to foster economic integration among Iran, Pakistan and Turkey. In 1968 he entered the university of Paris where he was awarded a doctorate in law.

Rouhani, though not religious himself, found time to write A Guide to the Contents of the Koran, as well as other books on religion. He also translated into Persian works by Plato and C.G.Jung, among others.

OPEC career
When OPEC set up its office in Geneva in 1961 before moving to Vienna  Rouhani was elected the organization's first secretary general, an administrative post that also involved mediating between conflicting factions. He served for three years, the only Iranian to do so. Currently, Iran is demanding that an Iranian be chosen to fill the current opening.

OPEC's success has long been a matter of debate, with many analysts saying that the marketplace and the willingness of one country, Saudi Arabia, to limit output have been the deciding factors in determining oil prices. The oil embargo of 1973 was initiated just by the Arab producers, not OPEC as a whole.

In 1964 Rouhani was succeeded by an Iraqi, Abd ar-Rahman al-Bazzaz, who encouraged talk of both radical politics and Islamic religion.

Personal life
Rouhani played the tar, a traditional Persian musical instrument, and was an accomplished pianist and co-founder of the Philharmonic Society of Tehran.

Rouhani was married for 76 years to Rohan, and together they had two daughters, Guitty Hosseinpour and Negar Diba. Negar Diba is married to Kamran Diba, the architect and first cousin to Empress Farah Pahlavi. Guitty Hosseinpour's son, Amir Hosseinpour is an international opera director and choreographer of note. After the Iranian revolution of 1979, when Rouhani's house and possessions were confiscated, he moved to Geneva, and later to London where he died aged 96.

Bibliography
History of OPEC
The Republic by Plato (as translator)
Psychology and religion by Carl Jung (as translator)

References

External links
 Fuad Rouhani is dead at Radio Farda

1907 births
2004 deaths
Alumni of the University of London
BP people
Iranian diplomats
Secretaries General of OPEC
Iranian translators
20th-century translators
Iranian emigrants to the United Kingdom
Iranian emigrants to Switzerland
Exiles of the Iranian Revolution in Switzerland
Exiles of the Iranian Revolution in the United Kingdom